Kilo Class is a 1998 novel by Patrick Robinson.  It features characters found in his earlier novel, Nimitz Class, including Admiral Arnold Morgan.

The submarines are wanted by China because their ability to operate silently at low speed would make it possible to dominate the Taiwanese Strait even against US Naval opposition. The novel is set in the United States, Russia, China, Taiwan and the Southern Ocean Kerguelen Islands.

According to WorldCat, the book is held in 987 libraries

References

1997 American novels
American thriller novels
Military of the United States in fiction
Works about the United States Navy
People's Republic of China war fiction
Novels about submarine warfare